The College of Arts & Sciences of Ohio University is a college of Ohio University, a public research university in Athens, Ohio. It is one of its eleven colleges and is centrally located in Wilson Hall on the College Green. The college features twenty organized academic departments.  Additionally, it hosts two centers for its International Studies and Law, Justice & Culture programs. The current dean is economist Florenz Plassman.

History

The first diplomas awarded by Ohio University, two in all, were Bachelor of Arts and Science degrees.  The university's first course offerings included Latin, Greek, rhetoric, English grammar, geography, logic, philosophy, literature, classics, astronomy, and various branches of mathematics, all of which still are offered in the College of Arts & Sciences. But since a liberal arts curriculum was all the university offered, the College of Arts & Sciences did not exist as a discrete entity until the university grew to include other colleges; it became a truly separate college—the College of Liberal Arts—in 1902.

Departments
Undergraduate students depend on the College of Arts & Sciences for a range of courses in the liberal arts, including required coursework in the humanities, the social sciences, and the natural sciences as the foundation for any degree they pursue within the university. Faculty in this college contribute substantial amounts of literature through Ohio University Press and imprint Swallow Press. The college features:

 African American Studies
 Biological Sciences
 Center for International Studies
 Center for Law, Justice & Culture (Undergraduate Certificate and freestanding M.A. program)
 Chemistry & Biochemistry
 Classics & Religious Studies
 Economics
 English Language & English Literature
 Environmental & Plant Biology
 Geography
 Geological Sciences
 History
 Linguistics
 Mathematics
 Modern Languages
 Ohio Program of Intensive English (OPIE)
 Philosophy
 Physics & Astronomy
 Political Science
 Psychology
 Sociology & Anthropology
 Women's, Gender & Sexuality Studies

References

External links

 Official website
 Official Athletics website

1902 establishments in Ohio
College of Arts and Sciences
University departments in the United States